İşhan is a village in the Yusufeli District, Artvin Province, Turkey. Its population is 294 (2021). The ruined Ishkhani monastery is situated in the village.

References

Villages in Yusufeli District